Thinking About Little Willie John and a Few Nice Things is the 21st studio album by American musician James Brown. The album was released in December 1968, by King Records, James Brown, who early in his career had opened shows for John, recorded a tribute album, Thinking About Little Willie John and a Few Nice Things, a little more than a half year since the death of Little Willie John, a prominent R&B singer from the mid-1950s to the 1960s.  Only Side One of the album is cover versions of Little Willie John songs.  Side Two is all instrumentals.

Track listing

References

1968 albums
James Brown albums
Albums produced by James Brown
King Records (United States) albums